A vaquero is a Spanish or Mexican rider noted for equestrian skill and ability to handle cattle.

Vaquero may also refer to:

Arts and entertainment
Vaquero (film), a 2011 Argentine film
Vaquero (band), a Mexican rock band fronted by Chetes
Vaquero (album), a 2017 album by Aaron Watson
Los Vaqueros, a 2006 album by Wisin & Yandel

Geography and geology
Los Vaqueros Reservoir, a man-made lake near Brentwood, California, US
Vaquero Formation, a geologic formation in California, US, dating back to the Neogene period
Vaqueros Formation, a sedimentary rock formation in southern California, US, of the Upper Oligocene and Lower Miocene

People
José Vaquero (1924–2006), Argentine politician
Vaquero (wrestler), Juan Miguel Escalante Grande (born 1977), Mexican luchador enmascarado
Vaqueiros de alzada, a northern Spanish nomadic people in the mountains of Asturias and León

Sports teams

Professional
Las Cruces Vaqueros, a baseball team in New Mexico, US
Vaqueros F.C., a football club in Guadalajara, Jalisco, Mexico
Vaqueros de Bayamón, a Puerto Rican basketball team
Vaqueros de Bayamón (baseball), a Puerto Rican baseball club 1974–2003

Scholastic
El Capitan High School Vaqueros, Lakeside, California, US
Santa Barbara City College Vaqueros, California, US
Texas–Rio Grande Valley Vaqueros, University of Texas Rio Grande Valley, US

See also
Buckaroo, derived from vaquero, an English word for a cowboy
Charro a regionally specific term for vaqueros in certain parts of Latin America
Ruger Vaquero, a single-action revolver developed by Ruger in 1993
Vaquera